Cubamar is a Cuban musical trio. They play a style of music called son.

Discography
 Cantinero de Cuba (1999). Produced and mixed by Daisuke Hinata. (Platinum Entertainment/Intersound/Global Disc Records).
 Havana Blend Tradicional (2008).
 Havana Blend Exotica (2008).
Rhythm and Smoke: The Cuba Sessions) (2004)

References

External link 

 Cubamar at Discogs

Cuban musical groups
Musical trios